

This is a list of Category A listed buildings in Scotland which date from after 1945 (the post-war period). The majority of these buildings are examples of Brutalist architecture or related modernist architecture which was ambitiously adopted by a number of Scottish architects, such as Sir Robert Matthew and Sir Basil Spence.

In Scotland, the term listed building refers to a building or other structure officially designated as being of "special architectural or historic interest".  Category A structures are those considered to be "buildings of national or international importance, either architectural or historic, or fine little-altered examples of some particular period, style or building type." Listing was begun by a provision in the Town and Country Planning (Scotland) Act 1947, and the current legislative basis for listing is the Planning (Listed Buildings and Conservation Areas) (Scotland) Act 1997.  The authority for listing rests with Historic Scotland, an executive agency of the Scottish Government, which inherited this role from the Scottish Development Department in 1991. Once listed, severe restrictions are imposed on the modifications allowed to a building's structure or its fittings. Listed building consent must be obtained from local authorities prior to any alteration to such a structure.

There are approximately 47,400 listed buildings and statues in Scotland, of which around 8% (some 3,600) are Category A. The number which date from post 1945 currently stands at 49, following the addition of the Cables Wynd House and Linksview House buildings in January 2017. The two oldest buildings in this list both commenced construction prior to World War II but completion then occurred in the post-war period, the buildings are generally considered post-war.

|}

Former Grade A listings

|}

A-Groups

 The University of Glasgow's Joseph Black building forms an A-Group with the Category A listed Graham Kerr building. The Graham Kerr building is a pre-war building, dating from 1923.
 The Sloy Awe power station forms an A-Group with the Category B listed Sloy dam.
 The Ben Cruachan turbine hall forms an A-Group and the Category B listed Cruachan dam which forms the reservoir above Loch Awe.
 The University of Edinburgh's David Hume Tower (Block A) and David Hume Lecture Block (Block B); and their Main Library, George Square, form an A-Group with their Category B listed William Robertson (Block C); Adam Ferguson (Block D) and George Square Theatre (Block E) buildings.
 The University of Stirling's Principals House and Pathfoot Building for an A-Group with the Nuffield Staff Houses (2-3, 4-5 and 6-7) Airthrey Castle Yard. The three buildings are Category B listed.
 The Edinburgh Botanic Garden's 1967 greenhouse forms an A-Group with the Head Gardener's Cottage, Inverleith House, 1858 Palm House and 1834 Palm Stove, Linnaeus Monument, Caledonian Horticultural Society Hall, and the Laboratory and Lecture Hall Buildings at 20a Inverleith Row.
 Robert Louis Stevenson Memorial forms an A-Group with a number of other Category A, Category B and Category C listed public art installations in Princes Street Gardens.

Bibliography

References

Notes